Chibamba Kanyama (born 26 January 1965) is a Zambian business leader and writer, specialising in communication strategy and economics.

Early life and education
Kanyama was born in Chikankata district, in the Southern Province of Zambia. He attended Chikankata Mission school for his secondary education. He then studied at the University of Zambia from 1985 to 1989, where he received a BA in mass communication (with economics). Kanyama later received a MSc Development Finance from the University of Reading in 2001 on a Chevening Scholarship.

Business career 
Kanyama began working at Zambia National Broadcasting Corporation (ZNBC) in 1989, where he rose to the position of Executive Producer. He later worked as Director at C K Media Agency between 1996 and 1998, Broadcasting manager at Zambia Institute of Mass Communication in 1999 and Corporate affairs director at Zambia State Insurance Corporation in 2002. He also served as corporate affairs director at Zambian Breweries in 2008 before returning to ZNBC as Director General in 2012.

In 2014 Kanyama took up an appointment by the International Monetary Fund as communications advisor, where he worked until 2016. After returning to Zambia, he worked at Bridges Limited where is a Founder Shareholder.

On 10th March, 2023, Chibamba Kanyama was appointed Ambassador-Designate to the United States of América by Zambian President Hakainde Hichilema.

Other contributions 
Since 2004 Kanyama has been the business columnist for The Zambia Post.

In 2011 he was appointed UNICEF Ambassador for the ‘Brothers for Life Campaign’ focusing on youth behaviours related to alcohol and substance abuse, violence, sexual abstenance and health living. He was also among three Zambians appointed Climate Change Ambassadors by the British Council in 2010.
In 2008, Kanyama initiated "Creating the Future", the first ever business conference for teenagers in Zambia. An average 4,500 young people attended the two conferences. He mobilised over US$40,000 for each period from the business community and international donor organizations such as the European Union. The initiative has since been registered as a trust, Teen Vision Trust Zambia.

Personal life 
Chibamba is married to Eneless and has four children.

Books 
 "Business Values for Our Time", Bridges Communications, 2010
 "Achievement Values for Young Adults", Bridges Communications, 2011
 "Determinants of FDI in Sub-Saharan Africa", Lambert Academic Publishing, 2012

References 

1965 births
Living people
Zambian businesspeople
People from Chikankata District
University of Zambia alumni
Alumni of the University of Reading